EZ2DJ is a series of music video games created by the South Korean company AmuseWorld. Basic gameplay is similar to Konami's beatmania series; however, as the franchise continues, it differs in style of music and gameplay. Beatmania series were became maniac style and there music styles were became biased to techno-style genre. But the EZ2DJ series offered various style musics even their series became mania style, music composers included at least popular-easy listening style genre music in each editions.(except the 7th trax). This is the difference  between EZ2DJ and Beatmania series. The first edition of EZ2DJ was introduced in 1999 and the last version, EZ2DJ Azure Expression ~Integral Composition~, was released in June 2012. Afterwards, following the lawsuit by Konami, the rights for franchise were given to Square Pixels company, and development continued under the title of EZ2AC, with latest version being EZ2AC Final EX, which was released in August 2020.

Audio System
EZ2DJ'''s cabinet features a total of 10 speakers. There are four mid-range speakers stacked vertically on either side of the screen, and two subwoofers located on the front of the machine. The cabinet also features a pair of headphone jacks, giving players the options to use their own headphones. Using headphones does not disable the external speakers.

Effector ButtonsEZ2DJ's cabinet features four red effector buttons, located at the top of the controller area. However, unlike the beatmania series, depending on the game mode, effector buttons are treated as a gameplay buttons, especially in the "Radio Mix" game mode, where each player needs to control two effector buttons. Essentially this is very similar to the 7-key mode of beatmania IIDX, but due to the location of these effector buttons—located in a row right at center of the console panel, right underneath the screen and away from the keyboard—it makes it even more difficult than beatmania IIDX'' on some occasions (especially since it also use the pedals).  Also, another game mode named "Space Mix" uses all four buttons along with all keys and turntables (excluding pedals), becoming the hardest mode in the game.

Lawsuit and ruling
On July 10, 2007, Konami won a patent infringement suit against AmuseWorld. Konami had originally filed a lawsuit against AmuseWorld in 2001 over the same issue which they settled out of court. It is believed that this settlement was due to the continued release of the title. Following the second trial, a Korean judge's ruling ordered AmuseWorld to pay Konami damages and stop production of the product completely. AmuseWorld paid 11.7 Billion won in satisfaction to Konami.

References

External links

1999 video games
Arcade video games
Arcade-only video games
Music video games
Turntable video games
Video games developed in South Korea
South Korea-exclusive video games